The 1988 Oklahoma Sooners football team represented the University of Oklahoma during the 1988 NCAA Division I-A football season. They played their home games at Oklahoma Memorial Stadium and competed as members of the Big Eight Conference.  It was Barry Switzer's final year as head coach of the Sooners.

Schedule

Personnel

Rankings

Season summary

at North Carolina

Arizona

at USC

Iowa State

vs. Texas

Jamelle Holieway left in first quarter with sprained right ankle following Oklahoma's first score.

Kansas State

Oklahoma set single game NCAA rushing record (768)

at Colorado

Kansas

Jamelle Holieway set school record for career total yardage.

at Oklahoma State

Oklahoma State's Brent Parker dropped a potential game-winning touchdown pass in the end zone with 43 seconds left.

at Missouri

Oklahoma's 30th straight conference victory

Nebraska

Charles Thompson broke his leg on Oklahoma's final offensive play of the game.

Florida Citrus Bowl (vs. Clemson)

Jamelle Holieway made the start in his final collegiate game.

Awards
DT Scott Evans
All-Big Eight

DB Scott Garl
All-Big Eight

OG Anthony Phillips
consensus All-American
NCAA Top Six Award

QB Charles Thompson
All-Big Eight

DT Curtice Williams
All-Big Eight

NG Tony Woods
All-Big Eight

Postseason

NFL draft
The following players were drafted into the National Football League following the season.

References

Oklahoma
Oklahoma Sooners football seasons
Oklahoma Sooners football